Pavel Mikhailovich Korotkov (July 24, 1907 in Moscow, Russia – September 23, 1983 in Moscow, Russian SFSR, Soviet Union) was a Russian ice hockey player, coach, as well as a football and bandy player.

Career
Korotkov played football for Dynamo Moscow from 1923-1940 and CDKA Moscow from 1941-1946. He won the Soviet Top League with Dynamo Moscow in 1936 and 1937, as well as the Soviet Cup with them in 1937.

In bandy, Korotkov was Soviet champions with Dynamo Moscow in 1933, 1935, and 1936. He won the Soviet Cup with Dynamo Moscow in 1937, 1938, and 1940. He also won the cup with CDKA Moscow in 1945 and 1946.

He started his ice hockey career in 1947 as the player-coach of CDKA Moscow. Korotkov joined VVS Moscow and served as their player-coach from 1948-1950. He spent the next nine years as a representative of ice hockey in the Committee of Physical Education and Sports of the Soviet Union.

Korotkov was inducted into the Russian and Soviet Hockey Hall of Fame in 1952.

References

Soviet ice hockey players
Soviet ice hockey coaches
Soviet footballers
Soviet bandy players
HC CSKA Moscow players
FC Dynamo Moscow players
PFC CSKA Moscow players
Soviet Top League players
1907 births
1983 deaths
Association footballers not categorized by position